Idi Sangathi is a 2008 Telugu film directed by Chandra Siddhartha. The film stars Tabu and Abbas in the lead roles with Raja in a cameo role. This film marks the second collaboration of Abbas and Tabu after Kadhal Desam (1996). The film is an adaptation of the novel Nuvve Kaadu.

Cast 

Tabu as Swarajyalakshmi 
Abbas as Satyamurthy
Sunil as Neeladri 
Kota Srinivasa Rao as Chief Minister
Raghunatha Reddy
Chalapathi Rao
Hema
Surya
M.S. Narayana
Venu Madhav
L. B. Sriram
Janardhan
Apoorva
Raja as Clover King (cameo appearance)
Anita Hassanandani and Samiksha as item numbers

Soundtrack

Music was composed by John. P. Varki and released on Madhura Audio.

Critical reception 
Rediff gave the film a two out of five stars stating that "Chandra Siddhartha has chosen a topical theme but fails in his depiction of it as the treatment is quite bland. Quite a disappointment, considering the good cast".

References 

2008 films
2000s Telugu-language films